Casey-Lee Jolleys (born 1974) is a British actress, dancer and performer.

Originally from Billinge in Wigan, Greater Manchester, Jolleys began performing at an early age and by the age of nine, had become a three-time world champion in ballet, tap and modern dance styles, making television appearances in the process.

By the late 1980s, she was a co-presenter of the BBC Saturday morning children's programme It's Wicked! (produced by BBC North West) and was appearing as Annie Mappin in the BBC comedy-drama series Gruey and the sequel, Gruey Twoey.

Jolleys returned to presenting around 1999 as a continuity presenter for Channel 5's children's programming strand Milkshake! and also appeared as Jenny in the pre-school series Beachcomber Bay.

In 2004 and 2006, Jolleys appeared in the guest role of Stacey Hilton (Orchid) in the long running ITV soap Coronation Street. For this, she won a Heritage Award for best comedy performance in a soap opera. Jolleys began a dance, drama, singing and comedy academy in her home town of Bolton, alongside comedian Bobby Ball who subsequently left the school.

In 2013, Jolleys starred in the BBC comedy-drama, Being Eileen.

References

External links

Casey Lee Jolley Academy.
Actress Casey Lee balances family life with her career - Asian Image.
A Jolleys good show! - thisislancashire.co.uk.
The Heritage Foundation President's Award.
BBC Nottingham - Peter Pan pantomime review.

1974 births
Living people
People from Wigan